SBS Sports is a South Korean pay television sports channel that broadcasts major sports events including the Olympics, FIFA World Cup and professional sports in Korea such as baseball and volleyball. It also broadcasts the Ligue 1, boxing matches and ISU Figure skating matches.

SBS Sports is currently run by CEO Kim Kee-sung.

History

In 1995, the channel was launched as Korea Sports TV. Five years later, in 2000, it was rebranded as SBS Sports Channel. In 2010, due to a partnership with ESPN, the channel was again rebranded as SBS ESPN. In 2014, the name is reduced to SBS Sports.

Announcers

 Park Sang-joon
 Jin Dal-rae
 Hong Jae-kyung
 Jo Min-ho
 Yoon Sung-ho
 Lee Dong-geun
 Lee Jae-hyung
 Kim Nam-hee
 Jo Jung-shik
 Kim Min-ah
 Yoo Hee-jong
 Kim Se-hee
 Jang Yoo-rye
 Jung Woo-young
 Ahn Hyun-joon
 Kim Se-yeon
 Yeo Eui-joo

Commentators 

 Football 
 Ice skating

 Baseball 
 Ice hockey
 Billiard : Oh Sung-kyoo
 Bowling : Oh Il-soo

 Basketball
 Volleyball : Choi Chun-shik, Lee Sang-yeol, Lee Jong-kyung, Chang So-yun, Kim Sa-nee
 Mixed martial arts : Kim Ki-tae
 Tennis : Yoo Jin-sun
 Boxing : Hong Soo-hwan
 Jokgu : Jung Chang-ma

Programming

Football 

 France: Ligue 1, Coupe de France, Coupe de la Ligue, Trophée des Champions
 AFF Championship (2018, 2020, 2022) 
 Football at the 2019 Southeast Asian Games – Men's tournament
2022 FIFA World Cup qualification – AFC Second Round
 Audi Cup
 Asian Games
 FIFA World Cup

Olympics 

 Summer Olympic (until 2024)
 Winter Olympic (until 2022)

Ice skating 

 Figure skating
 Short track speed skating

Baseball 

 KBO League
 WBSC Premier12 (2019)

Basketball 

 Korean Basketball League
 Women's Korean Basketball League

Volleyball 

 V-League (both men and women competition)
 FIVB Volleyball World Grand Prix

See also 
 SBS Love FM
 XtvN

Notes

References

External links 
  

Sports
Television channels in South Korea
Sports television networks in South Korea
Korean-language television stations
Television channels and stations established in 1995